Miloš Ninković (born 25 December 1984) is a Serbian Australian footballer who currently plays for A-League club Western Sydney Wanderers.

Club career

Čukarički
At a young age Ninković joined FK Čukarički's youth academy and later graduated into the club's first-team. He left Čukarički as a teenager to join Dynamo Kyiv.

Dynamo Kyiv
At the age of 19, he initially struggled for playing time in Dynamo. He gradually became a mainstay of the side, helping them win the Ukrainian Premier League three times and the domestic cup twice. The performances were noticed by Serbia's (now former) national team coach Radomir Antić, and he has since become a regular for the Serbian national team. In the 2010–11 season, Ninković was considered one of Dynamo's most crucial and talented players. Some team mates described Ninković having an "eye for goal" and being a very optimistic footballer.

Évian
In December 2012 it was announced that the last six months of Ninković's contract, which expires June 2013, was to be spent on loan with French club Évian. Ninković initially was negotiating a transfer to Red Star Belgrade, but was denied the possibility to shorten his contract with Dynamo from June 2013 to January 2013. Over a week after his loan spell to Évian was announced, Ninković told B92 that Red Star remained a fallback option for him, suggesting an eventual transfer to Red Star Belgrade after his contract and loan expire in June 2013.

Red Star Belgrade
On 4 July 2013, Ninković signed a one-year contract with an option for one additional year with Red Star Belgrade. Ninković's scored his first goals for Red Star on 17 August 2013, when he scored a brace against FK Jagodina.

Sydney FC
On 16 July 2015, Ninković signed a two-year contract with Sydney FC. Ninković scored the match-winning goal in the 88th minute of the tenth Sydney Derby to win the game for Sydney FC and put them at then the top of the table in round three of the 2015/16 season. During round 13 of the 2015/16 season, Ninković scored a brace in a 2–2 draw against Melbourne City.

Ninković enjoyed a good start to the 2016–17 A-League season, scoring 6 times, and with 7 assists within the space of 13 games. The playmaker backed up this form for the rest of the season, winning eleven Man of the Match awards resulting in claiming the Alex Tobin Medal for season's best player from Fox Sports Australia.

Ninković also won the Johnny Warren Medal for the 2016–17 season, becoming the first Sydney FC player to ever do so. He scored the winning penalty in the 2017 A-League Grand Final shoot-out for Sydney FC, securing them a third championship and ensuring him cult status.

On 9 May 2017, Ninković was re-signed by Sydney FC for another year as their new international marquee. Following a premiership winning season, it was announced that Ninkovic had re-signed for a further two-year deal. On 21 June 2022, it was announced on the club's website that Ninković decided to leave Sydney FC, ending his seven years association with the club.

Western Sydney Wanderers
It was announced on the 3rd of July 2022 that Ninković had joined arch rivals the Western Sydney Wanderers, signing a one year deal, ahead of the upcoming season. The move was met with controversy, with British newspaper The Guardian described him "as a mercenary, who thrown away his connection with the Sky Blues’ faithful, will likely permeate the fanbase", while his former teammate Alex Brosque said the move was a "slap in the face" to both clubs and criticised all those involved in a transfer, saying it should never have happened.

On 12 November 2022, Ninković made his first Sydney Derby appearance for the Wanderers, in which he was the subject of a pre-match tifo from The Cove criticising his decision to join the Wanderers; the tifo read ‘LEGENDS ARE CHERISHED. TRAITORS’ LEGACIES WILL PERISH’, along with depictions of club greats Steve Corica, Rhyan Grant and Alex Brosque as knights in shining armour, with Ninković's old No. 10 jersey being burned in the background. In the first Sydney Derby played at the reconstructed Sydney Football Stadium, and in front of a crowd of 34,232, the biggest Sydney Derby crowd since 2017, the Wanderers achieved their first Sydney Derby win at the Sydney Football Stadium in 3304 days, winning 1–0 through a Kusini Yengi goal in the 70th minute, with Ninković providing the assist.

International career
Ninković made his maiden appearance for the Serbian national team in 2009 against Sweden. 

He was a member of Serbia's 2010 FIFA World Cup squad. Having been benched in the match against Ghana, he was in Serbia's starting XI against Germany and Australia.

Personal life
Ninković became an Australian citizen in November 2022. He is married to Dejana, whom he met at a student party, and has three children, a son and two daughters.

Career statistics

Club

International

Honours

Club
Dynamo Kyiv
Ukrainian Premier League: 2006–07, 2008–09
Ukrainian Cup: 2004–05, 2005–06, 2006–07
Ukrainian Super Cup: 2006, 2007, 2009, 2011

Red Star
Serbian SuperLiga: 2013–14

Sydney FC
A-League Premiership: 2016–17, 2017–18, 2019–20
A-League Championship: 2016–17, 2018–19, 2019–20
FFA Cup: 2017

Individual
Johnny Warren Medal: 2016–17, 2020–21
 PFA A-League Team of the Season: 2016–17, 2017–18, 2018–19, 2019–20, 2020–21
 Joe Marston Medal: 2019
A-Leagues All Star: 2022

References

External links

 Ninković's profile at Dynamo's official website
 
 FIFA WC Player Profile – Miloš Ninković
 
 

1984 births
Living people
Footballers from Belgrade
Serbian footballers
Serbia international footballers
Serbia and Montenegro footballers
Serbian expatriate footballers
Serbia and Montenegro expatriate footballers
Association football midfielders
FK Čukarički players
FC Dynamo Kyiv players
FC Dynamo-2 Kyiv players
Thonon Evian Grand Genève F.C. players
Red Star Belgrade footballers
Members of the Assembly of KK Crvena zvezda
Sydney FC players
Western Sydney Wanderers FC players
Ukrainian Premier League players
Ukrainian First League players
Ligue 1 players
A-League Men players
2010 FIFA World Cup players
Expatriate footballers in Ukraine
Expatriate footballers in France
Expatriate soccer players in Australia
Serbia and Montenegro expatriate sportspeople in Ukraine
Serbian expatriate sportspeople in Ukraine
Serbian expatriate sportspeople in France
Serbian expatriate sportspeople in Australia
Marquee players (A-League Men)
Naturalised soccer players of Australia